Lydia Wanyoto Mutende (née Lydia Wanyoto), is a Ugandan lawyer, politician and diplomat, who served as the Deputy Special Representative of the Chairperson of African Union Commission (DSRCC), based in Addis Ababa, Ethiopia. From July 2014 until August 2014, she temporarily served as Head of the African Union Mission to Somalia.

Early life and education
Wanyoto was born in Mbale, in the Eastern Region of Uganda circa 1971.

She attended Fairway Primary School, in Mbale, where she obtained her primary school leaving certificate. She transferred to Gayaza High School, in Wakiso District, where she obtained her Ordinary Level certificate. She completed high school at Makerere High School, where she obtained her High School Diploma.

She was admitted to the Uganda Christian University (UCU), where she graduated with a Bachelor of Education in Languages, specializing in English literature, English language, French language and Kiswahili. She went on to obtain a Bachelor of Laws degree, also from (UCU).

She followed that with a Diploma in Legal Practice, awarded by the Law Development Centre, in Kampala. Her first master's degree, a Master of Arts in Human Rights Law, was obtained from Makerere University, Uganda's largest and oldest public university. Her second master's degree, a Master of Arts in Gender and Women Studies, was also awarded by Makerere University.

Career
In 1995, while a student at Makerere University, Wanyoto became active in campus politics and was elected as Chairperson of Marty Stuart Hall, one of the female halls of residence on campus. During the 1995 Constituent Assembly, she volunteered in the parliament chamber, helping the Assembly Chairperson with paperwork.

In 2001, Wanyoto was elected to the first East African Legislative Assembly, because they remembered her free service during the Constituent Assembly days, despite never having served as a member of the Uganda's parliament. She served in that role from 4 February 2001 until 10 February 2006.

Family
Lydia Wanyoto was married to the late James Shinyabulo Mutende (26 February 1962 – 2 October 2015), the former State Minister of Industry from 27 May 2011 until 2 October 2015.

Other considerations
Lydia Wanyoto is a member of the board of directors of Advocates Coalition for Development and Environment (ACODE), a Kampala-based think tank. She is also a member of the committee that was created to establish the National Defence College, Uganda.

In April 2019, Wanyoto was appointed to the board of directors of the National Planning Authority of Uganda, to serve a five-year term, renewable one time.

References

External links
 Website of Advocates Coalition for Development and Environment (ACODE)

Living people
1971 births
Law Development Centre alumni
Makerere University alumni
Members of the East African Legislative Assembly
National Resistance Movement politicians
People educated at Gayaza High School
People from Eastern Region, Uganda
People from Mbale District
Uganda Christian University alumni
Ugandan diplomats
21st-century Ugandan lawyers
Ugandan women diplomats
21st-century Ugandan women politicians
21st-century Ugandan politicians
Ugandan women lawyers